Since the 1968 Summer Olympics did not feature tennis as an official sport, two unofficial tournaments were held during the Games: a Demonstration tournament and an Exhibition tournament.

The Demonstration tournament was played from 14 to 20 October 1968 at three venues in Guadalajara, Mexico: Guadalajara Country Club, Atlas Sports Club and Guadalajara Sports Club; all of them featured clay courts. All matches were played at best-of-five sets; since the tiebreak rule wasn't implemented until the 1970s, a team had to win a set by a two-game margin in case of a 6–6 draw.

Americans Julie Heldman and Herb Fitzgibbon won the tournament by defeating West Germans Helga Niessen and Jürgen Fassbender 6–1, 6–3 in the final. Peaches Bartkowicz and Jim Osborne, also Americans, won the third place.

Seeds
The top two seeds received a bye into quarterfinals.

Draw

Bronze-medal match

References

External links
 Official Results Archive (ITF)

Demonstration
Mixed events at the 1968 Summer Olympics